This is a list of valleys in Estonia.

References 

Valleys
 
Estonia